Chiaramonti (Gallurese: Chjaramònti) is a comune (municipality) in the Province of Sassari in the Italian region Sardinia, located about  north of Cagliari and about  east of Sassari. It is part of the Anglona historical regione.

Chiaramonti borders the following municipalities: Ardara, Erula, Martis, Nulvi, Ozieri, Perfugas, Ploaghe.

References

External links

 Official website

Cities and towns in Sardinia